Lucien Josiah (born 16 July 1958) is a Botswana sprinter. He competed in the men's 100 metres and men's 200 metres at the 1980 Summer Olympics.

References

External links
 

1958 births
Living people
Athletes (track and field) at the 1980 Summer Olympics
Botswana male sprinters
Olympic athletes of Botswana
Place of birth missing (living people)